Tyukalinsk is a town in Omsk Oblast, Russia, located  northeast of the Nazyvayevsk railway station on the Trans-Siberian Railway and  northwest of Omsk, the administrative center of the oblast. Population:

History
In 1759, a post station of Tyukalinsky Stanets existed on the Tyukala River in place of modern Tyukalinsk. It developed into the sloboda of Tyukalinskaya in 1763. In 1823, it was granted town status, which was retracted in 1838, and reinstated in 1878. Tyukalinsk lost its commercial importance along with the Siberian Route after the construction of the Trans-Siberian Railway. On the outskirts of the town is a geoglyph made of pine trees that spell out "Lenin" (Ленин). Called "Lenin forest" by locals it was supposedly made in 1970, Vladimir Lenin's 100th birthday, though the exact date remains unknown.

Administrative and municipal status
Within the framework of administrative divisions, Tyukalinsk serves as the administrative center of Tyukalinsky District, even though it is not a part of it. As an administrative division, it is incorporated separately as the town of oblast significance of Tyukalinsk—an administrative unit with the status equal to that of the districts. As a municipal division, the town of oblast significance of Tyukalinsk is incorporated within Tyukalinsky Municipal District as Tyukalinsk Urban Settlement.

References

Notes

Sources

Cities and towns in Omsk Oblast
Tyukalinsky Uyezd